Nduli is an administrative ward in the Iringa Rural district of the Iringa Region of Tanzania. In 2016 the Tanzania National Bureau of Statistics report there were 6,933 people in the ward, from 6,626 in 2012.

Neighborhoods 
The ward has 11 neighborhoods.

 Igungandembwe
 Kilimahewa
 Kipululu
 Kisowele
 Mapanda
 Mibata
 Mji Mwema
 Msisina
 Mtalagala
 Njia Panda
 Sombeli

References 

Wards of Iringa Region